Mohammad Reza Ashtiani Araghi is an Iranian Shia cleric and conservative politician who represented Qom in the Iranian Parliament from 2004 to 2016.

He is among the authors of Tafsir Nemooneh.

Electoral history

References 

1940s births
Living people
People from Markazi Province
Members of the 7th Islamic Consultative Assembly
Members of the 8th Islamic Consultative Assembly
Members of the 9th Islamic Consultative Assembly
Deputies of Qom
Front of Islamic Revolution Stability politicians
Iranian individuals subject to the U.S. Department of the Treasury sanctions